The Annadale station is a Staten Island Railway station in the neighborhood of Annadale, Staten Island, New York.

History 
Annadale opened on May 14, 1860, when the Staten Island Railway was extended from Eltingville, one stop to the north. The original station building was replaced in 1910, moved a short distance, expanded into a residence, and finally moved to Historic Richmond Town in 1975.

The 1910 station was rebuilt in 1939 as part of a grade crossing elimination project. The station was rehabilitated in the 1990s as part of an SIR-wide upgrade/platform lengthening project.

Station layout
The station is located in a shallow open cut at Annadale Road and Sneden Avenue on the main line. It has two side platforms and light orange color walls and tiles.

Exits

The north end has a street-level brick stationhouse at Annadale Road, while the south end, next to Belfield Avenue, has an overpass and stairs to each platform. On the northbound side, there is a second set of stairs that leads to an adjacent parking lot near Tenafly Avenue, operated by the MTA as a park and ride facility.

References

External links

Staten Island Railway station list
Staten Island Railway general information
 Annadale Road entrance from Google Maps Street View
 Belfield Avenue entrance from Google Maps Street View
 Platforms from Google Maps Street View

Staten Island Railway stations
Railway stations in the United States opened in 1860
1860 establishments in New York (state)
Relocated buildings and structures in New York City